Fabrice Gael Ngah (born 16 October 1997) is a Cameroonian professional footballer who plays as a leftback for Egyptian side Ceramica Cleopatra FC.

Club career
A youth product of Astres, Ngah moved to Morocco with DHJ and then transferred to Raja Club Athletic in 2018.

International career
Ngah debuted for the Cameroon national team in a 1-0 win over Central African Republic on 3 December 2014.

References

External links

FDB Profile

1997 births
Living people
Footballers from Yaoundé
Cameroonian footballers
Cameroon international footballers
Association football fullbacks
Botola players
Elite One players
Raja CA players
Difaâ Hassani El Jadidi players
Cameroonian expatriate footballers
Cameroonian expatriates in Morocco
Expatriate footballers in Morocco